Euchromius bella is a species of moth in the family Crambidae. It is found in France, Spain, Italy, Croatia, Bosnia and Herzegovina, Hungary, Slovakia, Poland, Romania, Bulgaria, the Republic of Macedonia, Greece, Ukraine, Russia and Turkey.

The wingspan is about 17 mm.

References

Moths described in 1796
Crambinae
Moths of Europe
Moths of Asia